Miss Earth Venezuela 2018 was the 2nd edition of Miss Earth Venezuela, held on 12 August 2018 at Theater of Chacao Cultural Center in Miranda. Ninoska Vásquez of Lara crowned her successor Diana Silva of Lara at the end of the event.

Final results

Pre-Pageant Events

Press Presentation

Official contestants

24 contestants competed for the title.

References

External links 
 Miss Earth Venezuela Official Page

Miss Earth Venezuela
2018 in Venezuela
2018 beauty pageants